Burnham Grammar School (BGS) is a co-educational grammar school in Burnham, Buckinghamshire. In October 2011 the school became an academy. It takes students aged 11–18, with approximately 900 on roll.

The school has an all-weather full-sized tiger-turf sports pitch that the Wycombe Wanderers first team occasionally train on, complete with floodlights and changing room facilities.

In September 2004 the Department for Education and Skills (DfES) awarded the school specialist school status as a science college.

In May 2011 the school applied for academy status in order to be released from local education authority (LEA) control.

The school has a vertical tutoring system and students are split into four houses:

Winton – after Nicholas Winton
Roosevelt – after Eleanor Roosevelt
King – after Martin Luther King Jr.
Ali – after Muhammad Ali

The current headteacher is Andrew Gillespie, who took over from Catherine Long in January 2008. Previous to this, he was a regular teacher at the school.

For the last seven years, Burnham Grammar School has been the location of "Lighthouse Burnham". Lighthouse is a holiday week for children run by Christians from many local churches.

Notable alumni

Mike Ashley, entrepreneur
Jimmy Carr, comedian
David Connolly, professional footballer

References

External links
Department for Education Performance Tables 2011

Grammar schools in Buckinghamshire
Academies in Buckinghamshire
Burnham, Buckinghamshire